Marcel Groninger (born 19 August 1970) is a Dutch former footballer and current assistant coach of the Netherlands national under-21 football team. In 2013, Groninger won the national Rinus Michels Award for his coaching of Be Quick 1887.

Footballer career 
Groninger was a youth player of GRC Groningen, where he was scouted by FC Groningen. He then played in FC Groningen youth. In the season of 1990-1991 he was a member of FC Groningen's first squad. He played mostly on the second team that won the championship of the Reserveklasse. Groninger then played for SC Gronitas, VV Appingedam and Achilles 1894.

Manager career

Clubs 
Groninger started his coaching career at VV Helpman and in 2008 continued to Be Quick 1887. In his 6th season, Groninger and his team took a Hoofdklasse C championship. Following his achievements that season, on 10 May 2013 Groninger received the Rinus Michels Award as best coach in Dutch amateur soccer.

In July 2013, Groninger became the chief coach of then Topklasse-side HHC Hardenberg and an assistant coach of FC Groningen in the Eredivisie. With FC Groningen, Marcel Groninger won the 2014–15 KNVB Cup. With HHC Hardenberg, Groninger caused havoc when his team beat NEC Nijmegen from the Eredivisie in eight finals of the 2015–16 KNVB Cup. Subsequently, in its first KNVB Cup quarter finals ever, HHC Hardenberg lost 1-0 to AZ Alkmaar. At the conclusion of the 2015–16 season, Groninger left HHC to become the first assistant coach of the new chief coach Ernest Faber. At the end of 2017–18 Groninger left FC Groningen.

Netherlands under-21 
In 2019 Groninger became assistant coach of the Netherlands national under-21 football team, again under Ernest Faber. In August 2020, he served as caretaker coach after Erwin van de Looi was promoted to the staff of the senior team.

References 

1970 births
Living people
Footballers from Groningen (city)
Dutch footballers
Dutch football managers
FC Groningen players
Achilles 1894 players
Association football defenders
Be Quick 1887 players
Be Quick 1887 managers
FC Groningen non-playing staff